Chauncey Depew Leake (September 5, 1896 – January 11, 1978) was an American pharmacologist, medical historian and ethicist. Leake received a bachelor's degree with majors in biology, chemistry, and philosophy from Princeton University. He received his M.S. (1920) and Ph.D. (1923) from the University of Wisconsin in pharmacology and physiology.

Leake was born in Elizabeth, New Jersey.  At age 10, he was treated by the ophthalmologist Karl Koller.

Leake married the microbiologist Elisabeth Wilson in 1921, and they collaborated for many years. They had two sons and remained married until her death in 1977.

Leake discovered the anesthetic divinyl ether. One of his publications was a translation of the 1628 physiological work De motu cordis (On the Motion of the Heart) from Latin to English.

Leake became a fulltime university administrator from 1942, first at the University of Texas Medical Branch at Galveston and from 1962 at Ohio State University.

In 1973, Leake was one of the signers of the Humanist Manifesto II.

He was awarded the UCSF medal in 1975.

A collection of his papers is held at the National Library of Medicine in Bethesda, Maryland.

References

Literature
 Robinson, Victor: Victory Over Pain: A History of Anaesthesia.

External links 
 https://web.archive.org/web/20081010212901/http://www.nlm.nih.gov/hmd/manuscripts/ead/leake.html
 The old Egyptian medical papyri Logan Clendening lecture on the history and philosophy of medicine, University of Kansas, 1952. Full-text PDF.

1896 births
1978 deaths
Institute for Advanced Study visiting scholars
Writers from Elizabeth, New Jersey
University of Wisconsin-Madison School of Pharmacy alumni
University of Wisconsin–Madison faculty